2. Liga Interregional (2nd League Interregional in english) is the fifth tier of the Swiss football league system. From 2000 to 2012, it was the country's fourth level, From 2013, the league was demoted to fifth level. The division is split into 5 groups, 3 groups of 16 teams and 2 groups of 14 teams for 2022–23 season, by geographical region.

History 

2. Liga Interregional founded in 1924, refounded in 2000 the league between 1. Liga Classic and 2. Liga.

League Names 
Since the creation in 1924, the league has been called :

 1924–1925 : Division 1
 1925–1930 : Serie D
 1930–1931 : 5. Liga 
 1931–1944 : 4. Liga
 1944–1984 : 3. Liga
 1984–1989 : 3. Liga Elite
 1989–2000 : 3. Liga

Since the creation of Amateur League in 2000, the league has been called :

 2000–2023 : 2. Liga Interregional

Current season 
The 2022–23 season is the current season in the Swiss 2. Liga Interregional.

Group 1

Group 2

Group 3

Group 4

Group 5

Winners
The 2nd league interregional champions :

External links 
 http://www.football.ch/
 Interregional at soccerway.com

5
Swiss